Alexandra Kenworthy (born April 4, 1932) is an American voice actress. She was married to Marc Snegoff until his death in 1969. Together they had two sons: fellow voice artist Gregory Snegoff, and stuntman Tony Snegoff.

English dubbing roles
3×3 Eyes – Pai
Lensman – Lens
My Neighbor Totoro – Yasuko Kusakabe (Streamline Pictures dub)
Kiki's Delivery Service – Osono (Streamline dub)
Ringing Bell – Chirin's Mother
Robotech – The Regess, Azonia
Silent Möbius – Miyuka Liqueur
Zillion: Burning Night – Odama Elder

External links

American voice actresses
Living people
1932 births
21st-century American women